General elections were held in the Faroe Islands on 19 January 1932. The Union Party emerged as the largest in the Løgting, winning 11 of the 21 seats.

Results

References

Elections in the Faroe Islands
Faroe Islands
1932 in the Faroe Islands
January 1932 events
Election and referendum articles with incomplete results